The 2011 Suwon Samsung Bluewings season was the Suwon Samsung Bluewings' sixteenth season in the K-League. The club competed in the K-League, League Cup, Korean FA Cup and the AFC Champions League.

Current squad

Out on loan & military service

Match results

K-League

League table

Results summary

Results by round

K-League Championship

Korean FA Cup

League Cup

AFC Champions League

Group stage

Knockout round

Squad statistics

Appearances and goals
Statistics accurate as of match played 23 November 2011

Top scorers

Top assistors

Discipline

Transfers

In

Out

Honours

Club

Individual
K-League Best XI:  Yeom Ki-Hun

References

 Suwon Samsung Bluewings website

Suwon Samsung Bluewings seasons
Suwon Samsung Bluewings